Nostophobia is repugnance or dislike of the past, the antithesis of nostalgia. Nostophobic reactions are often encouraged to reduce resistance to workplace or similar changes. The fear of returning to one's childhood home is nostophobia combined with its comorbidity ecophobia: fear of house.

References

Emotions
Past